is a Japanese actress, voice actress and singer. She is the older sister of actress, voice actress and singer Moka Kamishiraishi.

Biography 
Born in Kagoshima, Her family lived in Mexico for three years due to her father's work. She can speak English and a little bit of Spanish. Her musical school teacher suggested that she participate in the 2011 Toho "Cinderella" Audition – a competition held by the film company, Toho Entertainment – she won the Special Jury Prize. She made her drama debut in the final episode of the NHK Taiga drama Gō: Hime-tachi no Sengoku starring Juri Ueno. She made her musical debut in The King and I in 2012. She played an aspiring geisha in the musical film "Lady Maiko" directed by Masayuki Suo. She was in charge of the theme song "Maiko wa Lady" which was released as a single under the name "Koharu". In 2016, she rose to international prominence as the lead female role in Makoto Shinkai's anime film Your Name, securing her an award at the 11th Seiyu Awards. Mone Kamishiraishi used the piano which she displayed for A Forest of Wool and Steel. She also learned classical ballet at the same time as musicals. There is also a scene where she dances ballet in the fourth episode of the short movie "Sky Blue Story" "Mone Kamishiraishi ~ Nike and Snail ~". She played Kanade Ooe in Chihayafuru, Aoi Nishimori in the live action film L-DK: Two Loves, Under One Roof and Nanase Sakura from TBS hit drama  "An Incurable Case of Love" in 2020. She starred in the drama series, "Oh My Boss! Love is a Separate Volume" as Nami Suzuki  and the taiga drama Reach Beyond the Blue Sky as Tenshō-in Atsuhime. On December 24, 2020, it was announced that she will play the role of Yasuko in the 105th asadora Come Come Everybody. It is the first time in the history of an asadora that three actresses will play each characters as different heroines. Kamishiraishi and Rina Kawaei were selected through an audition from 3061 applicants.

Filmography

Film

Television

Stage

Variety TV Show 
 TBS Sekai Kurabete Mitara - Regular MC (December 23, 2020 - present)
NHK 21st Waga Kokoro no Osaka Melody - Host (October 26, 2021)

Dubbing

Radio Drama

Radio

Internet video

Promotional video 

 Home Made Kazoku "Star to Line" (2011)
 HY "Happy" (2016)

CM 
 Calpis "Hot Series" (2011)
 St. "20,000 Beats TOURS Musical" Anne of Green Gables (2015)
 Suntory Natural Water of the Southern Alps x Your name. Mitsuha's Thoughts – Voice Appearance (2016)
 Daito Trust Construction, To live is to entrust. "Family" / "To Tokyo" (2017)
 Game On "BLESS" (2017)
 Cabinet Office Society 5.0 "Future Right There" (2018)
 Apple Japan "iPhone Privacy-Simple Things" –  Narration (2019)
 Bingo 5 with Ryunosuke Kamiki (2019)
 Suntory Foods "Iyemon" Tokucha (Special Tea Life)  (2019)
 Daiichi Sankyo Health Care Minon Amino Moist  (2019)
 Lottery "Dreaming Lottery"  (2019)
 Bingo 5 with Ryunosuke Kamiki (Birthdays, other things and important errands) (2021)
 Lottery "Dreaming Lottery Cafe" (2021)
 Suntory Foods "Iyemon" Tokucha (Cleaning up is an exercise) (2021)
 Suntory Foods "Iyemon" Tokucha (Health chance) (2021)
 Daiichi Sankyo Health Care Minon Amino Moist (2021)
 ORIX (Corporate CM) "The world is sustainable. Orix is also sustainable." (2021)
Takahashi Shoten "Notebook is Takahashi" (2021)

Advertisement 

 Keikyu (2011)
Takahashi Shoten "Notebook is Takashi" Image Character (2022 Edition)

Web advertising 

 ELLE PROMOTION "Tasaki" Pearl Jewelry Mone Kamishiraishi and the Story of White Pearls (2020)

Discography

Delivery

Singles

Cover Albums

Original Albums 

The deluxe edition of "note" which is titled "note book" was released on December 23, 2020. It contains the sound source from the online live concert "inote".

Music Video 
 The Favorite Songs Vol.1 "Kanade" (February 24, 2015) 
 The Favorite Songs Vol.2 "Home" (September 18, 2015)
 "366 Days" from the album "chouchou" (September 30, 2016) 
 "Storyboard" (July 6, 2017) 
 "Confession" (July 11, 2017)
 Mone Kamishiraishi x Takahito Uchisawa (Androp) "Happy End" Aoi version from the movie "L-DK: Two Loves, Under One Roof " (April 5, 2019) 
 "Eienwa Kirai" (June 12, 2019)
 "Ichiru" (Movie "Paradise" collaboration MV) (October 14, 2019) 
 "From The Seeds" Full Version (February 25, 2020) 
 "If You Squeeze the Dawn" (May 11, 2020) 
 "Shiroidoro" Short Ver. (August 22, 2020) 
 Mone Kamishiraishi x Takahito Uchizawa (Androp) "Happy End" Short Ver. featuring actor Yosuke Sugino (December 17, 2020)

Participation works

One-man live concert

Bibliography

Books 

 "Iroiro" published by NHK Publishing (2021)

Photo albums

 "a Button Vol. 9_Seishun: Mone Kamishiraishi/Moka Kamishiraishi"  published by PARCO Publishing (2012)

Magazine serializations

 Beautiful Lady & Television "girls be ambitious" (2011)
 Radio English Conversation (April 2020 issue-NHK Publishing) "Journey over the translated letter" "Akage no Anne" (2020)

Awards

References

Notes

Sources

External links
 

Actors from Kagoshima Prefecture
Japanese voice actresses
Japanese women pop singers
21st-century Japanese women singers
21st-century Japanese singers
Asadora lead actors
Musicians from Kagoshima Prefecture
People from Kagoshima
1998 births
Living people
Pony Canyon artists
Universal Music Group artists
Universal Music Japan artists